The John Paul II Foundation for Development and International Cooperation is a foundation named for John Paul II, that was established in Italy, in 2007. Foundation's base for the Middle East is placed in the city of Bethlehem. The foundation's main goal is to invest in the human capacity building. The John Paul II Foundation considers human as the building block of its growth. It as well organizes various programmes which aim to contribute the knowledge, resources and the infrastructure for the development on both individual and community levels.

Mission 
The John Paul II Foundation for Development and International Cooperation conducts various development programmes which aim for the overall progress and human and community advancement especially in the Middle East. The foundation bases all it acts on this approach and strives to improve the area through its main branch in the Middle East which operates in the city of Bethlehem.

Board of directors

 H.E. Mons. Luciano Giovanetti
 Fr. Ibrahim Faltas o.f.m.
 H.E. Mons. Rodolfo Cetoloni
 Mons. Giovanni Sassolini
 Rosa Carbone
 Andrea Verdi

Programmes 

 Children without Borders
 Football Academy
 Visitor Information Center

Partners 
 Custodia Terræ Sanctæ
 ADiSU (Agenzia Per il Ditto Allo Studio Universitatio dell’Umbria)
 ACLI (Associazioni Cristiani Lavoratori Italiani)
 Universita per Stranieri Perugia
 Palestinian Football Association
 Trentino
 Provincia di Firenze

References

External links 
 John Paul II Foundation website

Foundations based in Italy
Pope John Paul II